Agence Nationale de l'Aviation Civil is the civil aviation agency of Gabon. Its head office is in Libreville.

The predecessor agency, the Secrétariat Général à l'Aviation Civile et Commerciale (SGACC), was established in 1972. The current ANAC was established according to law 005/2008 of 11 July 2008.

References

External links

 Agence Nationale de l'Aviation Civil 
 Agence nationale de l'aviation civile du Gabon (Archive) 

Government of Gabon
Civil aviation in Gabon
Gabon
2008 establishments in Gabon
Transport organizations based in Gabon